Capsinolol is a beta blocker derived from nonivamide.  It is the first beta blocker with an associated calcitonin gene-related peptide releasing activity in the heart.

References

Beta blockers
N-isopropyl-phenoxypropanolamines
Carboxamides